Richard Cavendish may refer to:

 Richard Cavendish (Denbigh Boroughs MP) (died c. 1601), English courtier and politician
 Lord Richard Cavendish (1752–1781), Member of the Parliament of Great Britain
 Richard Cavendish, 2nd Baron Waterpark (1765–1830), Anglo-Irish politician and peer
 Lord Richard Cavendish (1794–1876), Member of Parliament, member of the Canterbury Association
 Lord Richard Cavendish (1871–1946), British aristocrat, author, magistrate and politician
 Richard Cavendish (occult writer) (1930–2016), British writer on topics dealing with the occult